Elliott Bennett (born 18 December 1988) is an English professional footballer who plays for  club Shrewsbury Town. He is the elder brother of footballer Kyle Bennett.

Club career

Wolverhampton Wanderers
Bennett grew up in Telford, Shropshire, and joined Wolverhampton Wanderers at age nine having been spotted playing in a local five-a-side tournament. He captained the club's under-12 team that travelled to Japan in 2001 and won the U12 World Cup, where he also picked up the Player of the Tournament award. He attended Thomas Telford School, where he captained the football team to win the County Cup five years in a row. Bennett was also a talented 200m sprinter and represented Shropshire at the English School Athletics Championships.

He left school to gain a scholarship at Wolves alongside Lee Collins, and signed professional forms with them in March 2007. The midfielder never made a league appearance for Wolves though, despite being picked for the first team squad several times, but did appear twice for them in the League Cup.

Brighton & Hove Albion
After spending time at loan at both Crewe (where he scored once against Port Vale) and Bury, Bennett signed a three-year contract with Brighton & Hove Albion on 20 August 2009. In November 2010 he signed a new three and half-year contract to keep him at Brighton & Hove Albion until the summer of 2014. Bennett enjoyed a successful season in 2010–11, playing a significant role in Brighton's promotion to the Championship. Scoring eight goals, Bennett gained a place in the PFA League One Team of the Year.

Norwich City

2011–12 season
On 14 June 2011, he signed for Norwich City on an undisclosed three-year deal. He was handed squad number 17 for the upcoming Premier League season. Bennett scored the third goal in a 3–0 pre-season win against Coventry City from 30 yards out. However, this was not enough to earn Bennett a starting place against Wigan Athletic on the opening day of the Premier League season where he came on as a sub, replacing Andrew Surman. On 9 April 2012, Bennett scored his first Premier League goal against Tottenham Hotspur at White Hart Lane with a strike from just outside the penalty area, which proved to be the winner in a 2–1 victory for the Canaries.

2012–13 season
Bennett started the 2012–13 season on the bench at Craven Cottage in the Canaries' 0–5 defeat. He picked up an injury coming on for Robert Snodgrass. Bennett then made his return in a League Cup clash against Doncaster Rovers which featured his younger brother Kyle Bennett. On 6 April he got two assists in a 2–2 draw against Swansea City. On 20 April, he scored in a 2–1 win against Reading.

2013–14 season
Having played in Norwich's opening Premier League fixture against Everton, Bennett injured his knee ligaments, requiring surgery, ruling him out until 2014. He made his return from injury on the final day of the season, replacing Nathan Redmond in the 76th minute of a 2–0 defeat to Arsenal.

Blackburn Rovers
On 5 January 2016, Bennett signed for Blackburn Rovers on a -year deal. Bennett scored his first Rovers goal on 27 February in a 3–2 victory over Milton Keynes Dons.

On 5 October 2017, Rovers announced that Bennett had signed a new two-year contract.

On 16 November 2018, Rovers announced that Bennett had signed a new two-and-a-half-year contract.

After the departure of Charlie Mulgrew to Wigan on a season-long loan, Blackburn Rovers manager Tony Mowbray announced Elliot Bennett would take over as club captain for the 2019–20 season.

Shrewsbury Town
On 17 June 2021, Bennett made the step down to League One, signing for Shrewsbury Town on a one-year deal. Bennett signed a contract extension of undisclosed length at the end of the 2021–22 season.

International career
Bennett qualifies to play for Jamaica through his paternal grandparents. He was called up to the Jamaica national team on 27 February 2015 for friendly games against Venezuela and Cuba.

Career statistics

Honours
Brighton & Hove Albion
Football League One: 2010–11

Norwich City
Football League Championship play-offs: 2015

Blackburn Rovers
EFL League One runner-up: 2017–18

Individual
PFA Team of the Year: 2010–11 League One

References

External links

1988 births
Living people
People from Telford
Sportspeople from Shropshire
English footballers
Association football midfielders
Wolverhampton Wanderers F.C. players
Crewe Alexandra F.C. players
Bury F.C. players
Brighton & Hove Albion F.C. players
Norwich City F.C. players
Bristol City F.C. players
Blackburn Rovers F.C. players
Shrewsbury Town F.C. players
English Football League players
Premier League players
Black British sportspeople
People educated at Thomas Telford School
English people of Jamaican descent